Jorgo Meksi (born 21 March 1995) is a professional footballer who currently plays as a right-back for Albanian club Skënderbeu. Born in Greece, he has represented Albania at youth international level.

References

1995 births
Living people
Place of birth missing (living people)
Greek people of Albanian descent
Greek footballers
Albanian footballers
Association football defenders
Panionios F.C. players
Ilisiakos F.C. players
KF Skënderbeu Korçë players
Kategoria Superiore players
Albania youth international footballers